Diogo Cão (-1486), anglicised as Diogo Cam and also known as Diego Cam,<ref>{{citation |contribution=Angola |title='Encyclopædia Britannica, 9th ed., Vol. II |editor-last=Baynes |editor-first=Thomas Spencer |display-editors=0 |publisher=Charles Scribner's Sons |location=New York |date=1878 |ref= |page=45 }}.</ref> was a Portuguese explorer and one of the most notable navigators of the Age of Discovery. He made two voyages sailing along the west coast of Africa in the 1480s, exploring the Congo River and the coasts of the present-day Angola and Namibia.

Early life and family
Little is known about the early life of Diogo Cão. According to tradition, he was born in Vila Real, Portugal, around 1452. His grandfather, Goncalo Cão, had fought for Portuguese independence at the Battle of Aljubarrota. 

By 1480, Cão was sailing off the coast of Africa in the service of João II. There is a record that he returned to Portugal with captured Spanish ships.Ravenstein 1900

Exploration

When the Treaty of Alcáçovas (1480) confirmed Portugal's monopoly on trade and exploration along Africa's west coast, João II moved quickly to secure and expand his hold on the region. In 1481, a fleet of ten ships was dispatched to the Gold Coast to construct a fortress known as Sao Jorge da Mina. The fort would serve as a commercial center for trade and an important point of resupply for Portuguese voyages. João II also re-instituted a program of exploration southward along the African coast, an initiative that had been held in abeyance during the war with Spain. Diogo Cão was selected to lead João's first voyage of exploration in 1482.

First voyage

When King John II of Portugal restarted the work of Henry the Navigator, he sent out Cão (probably around midsummer 1482) to explore the African coast south of the equator. Diogo Cão filled his ship with stone pillars surmounted by the cross of the Order of Christ and engraved with the Portuguese royal arms (padrãos), with the plan to erect one in every new place he would discover.

On his way, he stopped in the newly built Elmina Castle to stock up.

He discovered the mouth and estuary of the Congo, probably in August 1482 and marked it with a padrão, or stone pillar erected on Shark Point, attesting to the sovereignty of Portugal. This padrão still stands to this day, albeit in ruins.

He also sailed up the great river for a short distance and commenced modest commerce with the natives of the Bakongo kingdom. He was told that their King lived farther upriver. He sent four men to meet the King, kept four natives to serve as ambassadors of Kongo in Portugal, and sailed back down the Atlantic. Cão then coasted down along present Angola (Portuguese West Africa) and erected a second padrão, probably marking the termination of this voyage, at Cape Saint Mary (the Monte Negro of these first visitors).

The first padrão erected at the mouth of the Congo River, the S. Jorge, has been taken by an English ship that sunk, according to indigenous rumors (the base is still there). The second one, the St. Agostinho, still stands today, but is without its cross on top.

He returned to Lisbon by 8 April 1484 (on his return he discovered the Island of Annobón), where John II ennobled him, promoting him from esquire to a knight of his  household, and granted him an annuity (10000 reais) and a coat of arms where two padrões are represented. The King also asked him to sail back to Kongo to repatriate the 4 men he left behind.

Second voyage

That Cão, on his second voyage of 1484–1486, was accompanied by Martin Behaim (as alleged on the latter's Nuremberg globe of 1492) is very doubtful. But it is known that the explorer revisited the Congo and erected two more padrões on land beyond his previous voyage. The first was at Cabo Negro, Angola, the second at Cape Cross. The Cape Cross pillar probably marked the end of his progress southward, some 1,400 kilometers. Diogo Cão also embarked the four indigenous ambassadors, that he had promised not to keep for more than fifteen moons.

Cão sailed up the Kongo River (which he thought led towards the realm of Prester John), up to the neighborhood of the site of Matadi. There, in October or November 1485, near the falls of Ielala, he left an inscription engraved on the stone which testifies of its passage and that of his men: Aqui chegaram os navios do esclarecido rei D.João II de Portugal - Diogo Cão, Pero Anes, Pero da Costa. ("Here reached the ships of the enlightened king John II of Portugal – Diogo Cão, Pero Anes, Pero da Costa").

According to one authority (a legend on the 1489 map of Henricus Martellus Germanus), Cão died off Cape Cross; but João de Barros and others wrote of his return to the Kongo, and subsequent taking of a native envoy to Portugal. A report by a board of astronomers and pilots presented at a 1525 conference in Badajo clearly stated that his death happened near Serra Parda. A coast map by Henricus Martellus Germanus published in 1489 indicated the location of a padrão erected by Diogo Cão in Ponta dos Farilhões nearby Serra Parda, with the legend "et hic moritur" ("and here he died"). The Venetian cartographer Pietro Coppo corroborated this location of death in 1520.

The four pillars set up by Cão on his two voyages have all been discovered still on their original site, and the inscriptions on two of them from Cape Santa Maria and Cape Cross, dated 1482 and 1485 respectively, are still to be read and have been printed. The Cape Cross padrão was long in Berlin (replaced on the spot by a granite facsimile) but was recently returned to Namibia; those from the Kongo estuary and the more southerly Cape Santa Maria and Cabo Negro are in the Museum of the Lisbon Geographical Society.

Tributes post-mortem
In 1951, botanists Exell & Mendonça named a genus of plants from western central tropical Africa in honour of him, Diogoa.

In Vila Real, the plaza Diogo Cão was named after him. In the center of the plaza, stands a bronze statue of him supported on a square granite pedestal base.

In 1999, André Roubertou from the French Hydrographic Office (SHOM) named an undersea hole located off the southern coast of Portugal (Gulf of Cádiz) the Diogo Cão Hole.

In 2018, a hopper dredger called the Diogo Cao and immatriculated in Luxembourg was launched afloat.

In literature
Diogo Cão is the subject of Padrão, one of the best-known poems in Fernando Pessoa's book Mensagem, the only one published during the author's lifetime. He also figures strongly in the 1996 novel Lord of the Kongo by Peter Forbath.

See also
Portugal in the period of discoveries

References

SourcesEnglishPortuguese' Barros, João de. Décadas da Ásia, Década I. bk. III., esp. ch. 3;
 Ruy de Pina, Chronica d'el Rei D. João II.;
 Garcia de Resende, Chronica;
 Luciano Cordeiro, Diogo Cão in Boletim da Sociedade de Geografia de Lisboa, 1892;
 António da Costa de Albuquerque de Sousa Lara, 2nd Count de Guedes, Vasco de Bettencourt de Faria Machado e Sampaio and Marcelo Olavo Correia de Azevedo, Ascendências Reais de Sua Alteza Real a Senhora Dona Isabel de Herédia Duquesa de Bragança, I, pelos Costados Herédia, Bettencourt e Meneses da Ilha da Madeira''" (Universitária Editora, 1999)

External links
 Diogo Cão
 (pt) Os descobrimentos portugueses: Diogo Cão e Bartolomeu Dias

1450s births
15th-century deaths
15th-century explorers of Africa
15th-century Portuguese people
Portuguese explorers
Portuguese navigators
Maritime history of Portugal
People from Vila Real, Portugal